169 km is a rural locality (a passing loop) in Dracheninskoye Rural Settlement of Leninsk-Kuznetsky District, Russia. The population was 2 as of 2010.

Geography 
The passing loop is located on the Yurga-Tashtagol line, 20 km west of Leninsk-Kuznetsky (the district's administrative centre) by road.

Streets 
 Zheleznodorozhnaya

References 

Rural localities in Kemerovo Oblast